Robert "Bobby" Lloyd was born on 1888 in Crickhowell, Wales. He was also known by the nickname of "The Hafodyrynys Wonder", was a Welsh rugby footballer who represented Wales in both rugby union and rugby league. He played union for Welsh clubs Pontypool and Monmouthshire County as a scrum half back, gaining selection for Wales, before moving to England to play league for Halifax (Heritage № 237), also in the halves, and gaining selection for Great Britain and Wales. He died on 18 January, 1930 while in Halifax, England.

Rugby union

Lloyd worked as a miner, and in 1912 was part of the Monmouthshire County team that faced the touring South Africans. Lloyd played well and gave the Springbok halves, Freddie Luyt and Uncle Dobbin a difficult match, though the tourists class shone through to win the game comfortably. A scrum-half, Lloyd was first capped for Wales in a winning game against Scotland on 1 February 1913. The game was played at Inverleith and both sides had a sparsity of international experience; though Wales were captained by the veteran Billy Trew. Lloyd played in the next six consecutive games in the 1913 and 1914  Five Nations Championships, which saw Wales finish second to England in both tournaments. Lloyd was a favourite at Pontypool and was one of the finest scrum-halves produced by the club.

International matches for Wales
  1914
  1913, 1914
Ireland  1913, 1914
  1913, 1914

Rugby league
Bobby Lloyd went north and in 1914 commenced playing for English Northern Rugby Football Union club; Halifax. He was selected to go on the 1920 Great Britain Lions tour of Australia and New Zealand. Lloyd won a cap for Great Britain while at Halifax in 1920 against Australia. Lloyd won a cap for Wales while at Halifax in 1921.

Bobby Lloyd played  in Halifax's 0-13 defeat by Leigh in the 1920–21 Challenge Cup Final during the 1920–21 season at The Cliff, Broughton on Saturday 30 April 1921, in front of a crowd of 25,000.

References

Bibliography

External links
!Great Britain Statistics at englandrl.co.uk (statistics currently missing due to not having appeared for both Great Britain, and England)

1880s births
1930 deaths
Dual-code rugby internationals
Great Britain national rugby league team players
Halifax R.L.F.C. players
Pontypool RFC players
Monmouthshire County RFC players
Rugby league halfbacks
Rugby league players from Powys
Rugby league utility players
Rugby union players from Crickhowell
Rugby union scrum-halves
Wales international rugby union players
Wales national rugby league team players
Welsh miners
Welsh rugby league players
Welsh rugby union players